Charles Earland Anderson was a provincial level politician from Alberta, Canada. He served as a member of the Legislative Assembly of Alberta from 1979 to 1982 sitting with the governing Progressive Conservative caucus during his time in office.

Political career
Anderson ran for a seat to the Alberta Legislature in the 1979 Alberta general election. He won the electoral district of St. Paul to hold it for the governing Progressive Conservatives in a tight race over NDP candidate Laurent Dubois and two other candidates. He retired from provincial politics at dissolution of the assembly in 1982.

References

External links
Legislative Assembly of Alberta Members Listing

Progressive Conservative Association of Alberta MLAs
Living people
1942 births